Richard John Hayward, FBA (born 1937), often known as Dick Hayward, is a linguist and retired academic. He is emeritus professor of Ethiopian linguistic studies at the School of Oriental and African Studies.

Career 

Born in 1937, Hayward attended the University of London, graduating with a Bachelor of Science degree in 1958 and completing a Doctor of Philosophy degree in 1976.

Hayward taught at a school in Yorkshire from 1968 to 1971, before being employed as a lecturer in linguistics at the School of Oriental and African Studies from 1971; promoted to reader in phonology in 1988, he was subsequently appointed professor of Ethiopian linguistic studies and gave his inaugural lecture in 1994. He retired in 2002 and was appointed emeritus professor of Ethiopian linguistic studies.

In 1987, Hayward was elected a fellow of the British Academy, the United Kingdom's national academy for the humanities and social sciences.

Publications 
 The Arbore Language: A First Investigation, Including a Vocabulary, Kuschitische Sprachstudies, 2 (Hamburg: H. Buske, 1984). 
 (with Enid M. Parker) An Afar–English–French Dictionary: With Grammatical Notes in English (London: School of Oriental and African Studies, 1985). 
 (editor) Omotic Language Studies (London: School of Oriental and African Studies, 1990). 
 The Challenge of Omotic: An Inaugural Lecture Delivered on 17 February 1994 (London: School of Oriental and African Studies, 1995). 
 (with Eshetu Chabo) Gamo–English–Amharic Dictionary: With an Introductory Grammar of Gamo (Wiesbaden: Harrassowitz Verlag, 2014).

References 

1937 births
Living people
Linguists from the United Kingdom
Alumni of the University of London
Academics of SOAS University of London
Fellows of the British Academy
Ethiopianists